Norman Parker may refer to:

Norman Parker (speedway rider) (1908–1999), British international speedway rider 
Norman Parker (author) (born 1944), convicted killer, author and journalist
Murray Parker (cricketer) (Norman Murray Parker, born 1948), former New Zealand cricketer